"So You Like What You See" is new jack swing song by Samuelle from his 1990 album Living in Black Paradise. The hit song spent two weeks at number-one on the US R&B chart, but did not place on the Billboard Hot 100. The music video is notable for featuring a young Tyra Banks.

See also
R&B number-one hits of 1990 (USA)

References

1990 singles
1990 songs
New jack swing songs
Song articles with missing songwriters